Feneu is a commune in the Maine-et-Loire department in western France.

See also
Communes of the Maine-et-Loire department
Le site du comité des fêtes de Feneu, organisateur du triathlon et de la brocante

References

Communes of Maine-et-Loire